Willard N. Jones (1869–?) was a civil engineer and timber dealer in the U.S. state of Oregon. He served as a Republican in the Oregon Legislative Assembly in 1903, and was convicted of fraud in 1906.

Jones was born in Pennsylvania in 1869 and educated at Alfred University. He moved west in 1887 and became a civil engineer, spending time in Minnesota, Montana, and British Columbia. He moved to Portland in 1891, where he worked as a timber salesman. He partnered with Stephen A. Douglas Puter, who was later known as the "Oregon land fraud king."

References 

1869 births
People from Pennsylvania
Politicians from Portland, Oregon
Republican Party members of the Oregon House of Representatives
Oregon politicians convicted of crimes
Year of death missing